Shivani Gosain is an Indian television actress, who appeared in Mythological Serials like Jai Ganga Maiya As Devi Uma, Jai Mahalakshmi as Devi Saraswati & various other serials like Kasautii Zindagii Kay, Kahaani Ghar Ghar Kii, Rang Badalti Odhani, Love U Zindagi and Piya Ka Ghar Pyaara Lage. Moreover, she has also appeared in episodics of Ssshhhh...Phir Koi Hai.

Television
Ramanand Sagar's Jai Mahalakshmi as Devi Saraswati
STAR Plus' Kasautii Zindagii Kay, Kahaani Ghar Ghar Kii and Love U Zindagi, Saraswatichandra as Sunanda 
STAR One's Rang Badalti Odhani 
Ssshhhh... Phir Koi Hai - Nayi Maa as Meena (2007) 
Ssshhhh... Phir Koi Hai - Do Gaz Zameen Ke Neechey (2008)
Ssshhhh... Phir Koi Hai - Vetaal Ki Wapsi (2008)
Sahara One's Piya Ka Ghar Pyaara Lage
Colors TVʼs Kasam Tere Pyaar Ki as Parminder Arun  Kohli a.k.a. Pammi, Shakti - Astitva Ke Ehsaas Ki as Sunaina Singh, Choti Sarrdaarni as Vijyeta Mallik, Naagin 5 as Ritu Sharma  
Kahaan Hum Kahaan Tum as Rani
Kabhi Saas Kabhi Bahu as Shalini
Ramanand Sagar's Jai Ganga Maiya as Devi Uma

Personal life
Gosain married Rajeev Gandhi in late 2011, whom she had met on Facebook. After a few weeks, she opted for a divorce.

References

External links

Living people
Indian television actresses
Actresses in Hindi television
Actresses from Delhi
1975 births